The 3rd Cavalry Corps was a corps of the Soviet Red Army.

History 
As part of the 11th Army, it took part in the Soviet invasion of Poland in 1939.

The Corps was recreated on November 20, 1941 on the basis of the Dovator Cavalry Group. 
For its excellent performance behind the German lines, by order of the NPO No. 342 of November 26, 1941, the 3rd Cavalry Corps was transformed into the 2nd Guards Cavalry Corps, which fought during the rest of the war.

Organization (1939) 
 7th Cavalry Division
 36th Cavalry Division (Soviet Union)
 6th Tank Brigade

Commanders 
 Commander Semyon Konstantinovich Timoshenko (02.1925 - 17.08.1933),
 Commander Leonid Veyner (17.08.1933 - 05.1935),
 Komdiv Danilo Srdić (17.07.1935 - fired 29.06.1937, arrested 15.07.1937, executed 26.07.1937),
 Komdiv Georgy Zhukov (07.1937 - 02.1938),
 Komdiv Yakov Cherevichenko (03.1938 - 06.1940).

2nd formation 
 General-Major Lev Dovator (20.11.1941 - 19.12.1941), KIA
 General-Major Issa Pliyev (19.12.1941 - 05.03.1942);
 General-Major, General-Lieutenant Vladimir Kryukov (06.03.1942 - December 1945).

References 

Cavalry corps of the Soviet Union
Military units and formations of the Soviet invasion of Poland